Sphaerisporangium melleum is an actinomycete species of bacteria first isolated from sandy soil. It produces branching substrate mycelia and spherical spore vesicles on aerial hyphae that contain non-motile spores. They also contained diaminopimelic acid and the N-acetyl type of peptidoglycan. Its type strain is 3-28(8)T (=JCM 13064T =DSM 44954T).

References

Further reading
Cao, Yan-Ru, et al. "Sphaerisporangium flaviroseum sp. nov. and Sphaerisporangium album sp. nov., isolated from forest soil in China."International Journal of Systematic and Evolutionary Microbiology 59.7 (2009): 1679-1684.
Mingma, Ratchanee, et al. "Sphaerisporangium rufum sp. nov., an endophytic actinomycete from roots of Oryza sativa L." International Journal of Systematic and Evolutionary Microbiology 64.Pt 4 (2014): 1077–1082.
Duangmal, Kannika, et al. "Sphaerisporangium siamense sp. nov., an actinomycete isolated from rubber-tree rhizospheric soil." The Journal of Antibiotics 64.4 (2011): 293–296.

External links
LPSN

Type strain of Sphaerisporangium melleum at BacDive -  the Bacterial Diversity Metadatabase

Pseudonocardineae
Bacteria described in 2007